Countess Sophie Polyxena Concordia of Sayn-Wittgenstein-Hohenstein (28 May 1709 – 15 December 1781), official titles: Gräfin zu Sayn, Wittgenstein und Hohenstein, Frau zu Homburg, Vallendar, Neumagen, Lohra und Klettenberg, was a countess from the House of Sayn-Wittgenstein-Hohenstein and through marriage Fürstin of Nassau-Siegen.

Biography
Sophie Polyxena Concordia was born in Berlin on 28 May 1709 as the second daughter of Count August of Sayn-Wittgenstein-Hohenstein and his first wife, Countess Concordia of Sayn-Wittgenstein-Hohenstein. Sophie Polyxena Concordia was baptised on 11 June in Berlin a week after the death of her mother. Her father was Oberhofmarschall at the court of King Frederick I of Prussia until 1710 and, for eight years (1702–1710), was a member of the Drei-Grafen-Kabinett with Minister President Johann Kasimir Kolb Graf von Wartenberg and Generalfeldmarschall Alexander Hermann Graf von Wartensleben.

Sophie Polyxena Concordia married at Ludwigseck Hunting Lodge near  on 23 September 1728 to Fürst Frederick William II of Nassau-Siegen (Siegen, 11 November 1706 – Nassauischer Hof, Siegen, 2 March 1734), the only son of Fürst Frederick William Adolf of Nassau-Siegen and his first wife, Landgravine Elisabeth Juliana Francisca of Hesse-Homburg.

Sophie Polyxena Concordia and Frederick William were related, Countess Elisabeth of Nassau-Siegen, the great-great-grandmother of Sophie Polyxena Concordia was an older half-sister of Count Henry of Nassau-Siegen, the great-grandfather of Frederick William.

On the death of his father in 1722, Frederick William succeeded his father as the territorial lord of the Protestant part of the Principality of Nassau-Siegen and co-ruler of the city of Siegen. He possessed the district of Siegen (with the exception of seven villages) and the districts of Hilchenbach and Freudenberg. He shared the city of Siegen with the Catholic Fürst of Nassau-Siegen. Finally, Frederick William succeeded his father in a part of the Principality of Nassau-Hadamar. But because he was still a minor, he was under the guardianship and regency of his stepmother Amalie Louise until 1727.

1733 was a sad year for the couple. In March, their youngest daughter died, and in November their second daughter. The following year, Frederick William died, aged 27. On 19 June Sophie Polyxena Concordia gave birth to her fifth daughter. Thus, there were no male heirs. Sophie Polyxena Concordia, the Dowager Fürstin, was compelled to accept that the Catholic Fürst, William Hyacinth, would take possession of the Reformed lands and the city of Siegen. However, the Fürsten Christian of Nassau-Dillenburg and William Charles Henry Friso of Nassau-Diez also laid claim to the inheritance. Their soldiers occupied the Nassauischer Hof in Siegen, while William Hyacinth was in Spain.

In order to drive out this occupation by Nassau-Dillenburg and Nassau-Diez, Elector Clemens August of Cologne called in the Landesausschuß in his countries bordering the Siegerland. On 20 August 1735, peasants from Cologne crossed the borders of the Principality of Nassau-Siegen and plundered ‘was ihnen vorkam’ (‘what was in front of them’). On 23 August, they were admitted to the (Catholic) castle and advanced with two to three thousand men to the (Reformed) Nassauischer Hof. But the armies of Nassau-Dillenburg and Nassau-Diez, united with the citizens of Siegen, forced the troops from Cologne to flee. Thus, the Reformed part of Siegerland remained under the rule of Nassau-Dillenburg and Nassau-Diez, and the Catholic part remained under the imperial administration.

Even as a widow, Sophie Polyxena Concordia continued to live in the Nassauischer Hof, which since the mid-18th century has been called the Untere Schloss. The south wing of the palace is still called the Wittgensteiner Flügel after her. She organised the marriage of her brother Frederick to her sister-in-law Augusta Amalia in 1738 and, after the latter’s death in 1742, to her youngest sister-in-law, Elisabeth Hedwig, in 1743. The last marriage she organised was that of her granddaughter, Countess Clementine of Bentheim-Steinfurt, to Count Ferdinand Casimir of Isenburg-Büdingen-Wächtersbach in 1775.

During the visits to his German lands in 1741 and 1742, Prince William IV of Orange-Nassau stayed with Sophie Polyxena Concordia and her mother-in-law Amalie Louise in the Nassauischer Hof in Siegen. In 1759, Sophie Polyxena Concordia lost her three living daughters, the eldest and the third in April, and the youngest in June.

When, during the renovation of the Fürstengruft in 1951, the marble slabs that had been placed in front of the niches in 1893 had to be reattached, it was possible to take a look inside the graves. It was discovered that many graves had already been opened. Behind the slabs were walls of field-baked bricks, some of which were loose and allowed a view into the interior of the niches. In the light of a strong flashlight one could see that on the coffin of Sophia Polyxena Concordia, the artistic bronze handles covered with patina were particularly striking.

Issue
From the marriage of Sophie Polyxena Concordia and Frederick William the following children were born:
 Charlotte Sophia Louise (Siegen, 6 June 1729 – Burgsteinfurt, 2 April 1759), married in Siegen on 30 September 1748 to Count Charles Peter Ernest of Bentheim-Steinfurt (Burgsteinfurt, 30 August 1729 – Burgsteinfurt, 30 June 1780).
 Frederica Wilhelmine Polyxena (Nassauischer Hof, Siegen, 3 April 1730 – Wittgenstein Castle, Laasphe, 18 November 1733).
 Mary Eleonore Concordia (Siegen, 2 March 1731 – Kamen, 20 April 1759).
 Frederica Augusta Sophia (Nassauischer Hof, Siegen, 1 June 1732 – Nassauischer Hof, Siegen, 23 March 1733).
 Anne Charlotte Augusta (Nassauischer Hof, Siegen, 19 June 1734 – Untere Schloss, Siegen, 9 June 1759).

Ancestors

Notes

References

Sources
 
 
 
 
 
 
 
 
 
  (2004). "Die Fürstengruft zu Siegen und die darin von 1669 bis 1781 erfolgten Beisetzungen". In:  u.a. (Redaktion), Siegener Beiträge. Jahrbuch für regionale Geschichte (in German). Vol. 9. Siegen: Geschichtswerkstatt Siegen – Arbeitskreis für Regionalgeschichte e.V. p. 183–202.
  (1882). Het vorstenhuis Oranje-Nassau. Van de vroegste tijden tot heden (in Dutch). Leiden: A.W. Sijthoff/Utrecht: J.L. Beijers.

External links

 Nassau. In: Medieval Lands. A prosopography of medieval European noble and royal families, compiled by Charles Cawley.
 Nassau Part 5. In: An Online Gotha, by Paul Theroff.

|-

Sayn-Wittgenstein-Hohenstein, Sophie Polyxena Concordia
Sayn-Wittgenstein-Hohenstein, Sophie Polyxena Concordia
Sayn-Wittgenstein-Hohenstein, Sophie Polyxena Concordia
House of Sayn-Wittgenstein
∞
Princesses of Nassau
People from Berlin
Sayn-Wittgenstein-Hohenstein, Sophie Polyxena Concordia